Berlitz can refer to:

 Berlitz Corporation, formerly Berlitz International
 Maximilian Berlitz, founder of the Berlitz Language Schools
 Charles Berlitz, grandson of Maximilian Berlitz and author of several Bermuda Triangle related books
 Platinum Berlitz, one of the Pokédex holders in Pokémon Special